Iroha is an English post-metal band from Birmingham, England, formed by former Final member Andy Swan featuring Jesu bassist Diarmuid Dalton and former Rumblefish and Low Art Thrill member, Dominic Crane.

History
Guitarist and vocalist Andy Swan was an original member of Final, an experimental electronics outfit from Birmingham, England. Formed as a duo in 1983, Final also featured Justin Broadrick who went on to be a member of Napalm Death and Head of David before forming the highly influential Godflesh. Final were joined on some recordings by Napalm Death founding member Nicholas Bullen, who also went on to form Scorn. After leaving Final in 1985, Swan switched his attention to the dance scene for the next decade before forming Iroha in 2008.

Bassist Diarmuid Dalton was an original member of Cable Regime and also plays bass in Jesu.

Guitarist and vocalist Dominic Crane was an original member of Rumblefish who released a self-titled album on Atlantic Records imprint East West Records in 1992 and reached No. 34 in the Indie Charts with "Tug Boat Line".

Signed to Denovali Records in 2010, Iroha's first release was a split EP with French artist Fragment. entitled "Bittersweet" and was described by The Sleeping Shaman as "a perfectly balanced, heartbreaking, yet life-affirming, piece of modern music".

Iroha's debut self-titled album was released by Denovali Records in February 2011 followed in September 2011 by a four track EP entitled "End of an Era".

Iroha's second album, Shepherds & Angels, was released on 7 December 2012 via Denovali Records.

Discography

Studio albums
Iroha (18 February 2011) Denovali Records
Shepherds & Angels (7 December 2012) Denovali Records

Singles
"Bittersweet" (2010) Denovali Records
"End of an Era" (2011) Denovali Records

References

English experimental musical groups
Post-metal musical groups
Musical groups established in 2008
British shoegaze musical groups
English heavy metal musical groups
Drone metal musical groups
British musical trios
Musical groups from Birmingham, West Midlands
Sadcore and slowcore groups